Leptaegeria is a genus of moths in the family Sesiidae.

Species
Leptaegeria axiomnemoneuta Zukowsky, 1936
Leptaegeria cillutincariensis  Zukowsky, 1936
Leptaegeria costalimai Köhler, 1953
Leptaegeria flavocastanea Le Cerf, 1916
Leptaegeria harti (Druce, 1899)
Leptaegeria schreiteri Köhler, 1941

References

Sesiidae